Raziat (Roza) Basirovna Chemeris (née Glubokovskaya; born 7 June 1978) is a Russian politician who was elected to the State Duma on the federal list for the New People party in 2021.

Political career 
Chemeris previously stood for election under the United Russia banner.

Personal life 
She is Avar by nationality. Her mother Elmira Glubokovskaya sat in the Duma from 2007 to 2016. Roza's father-in-law Mikhail Glubokovsky was also member of the Duma in 1993–1999.

See also 

 List of members of the 8th Russian State Duma

References 

1978 births
Living people
Avar people

Eighth convocation members of the State Duma (Russian Federation)
Moscow State Institute of International Relations alumni
21st-century Russian women politicians
United Russia politicians
New People politicians